The 1906 Intercalated Games or 1906 Olympic Games was an international multi-sport event that was celebrated in Athens, Greece. They were at the time considered to be Olympic Games and were referred to as the "Second International Olympic Games in Athens" by the International Olympic Committee. However, the medals that were distributed to the participants during these games are not officially recognised by the Olympic Committee and are not displayed with the collection of Olympic medals at the Olympic Museum in Lausanne, Switzerland.

Intercalated Games
The Intercalated Olympic Games were to be a series of International Olympic Games halfway between what is now known as the Games of the Olympiad. This proposed series of Games, intercalated in the Olympic Games cycle, was to always be held in Athens, and were to have equal status with the international Games. However, the only such Games were held in 1906.

The first Intercalated Games had been scheduled by the International Olympic Committee in 1901 as part of a new schedule, where every four years, in between the internationally organised Games, there would be Intermediate Games held in Athens.

This was a compromise: after the successful Games of Athens 1896, the Greeks suggested they could organise the games every four years. Since they had the accommodation and had proven they could hold well-organised games, they received substantial public support. However, Pierre de Coubertin, the founder of the International Olympic Committee, opposed this: he had intended for the first Games to be in Paris in 1900. After Paris had lost the première Olympics, de Coubertin did not want the games to be permanently hosted elsewhere. 

Unfortunately, the 1900 Games were overshadowed by the Exposition Universelle, whose organizing committee disagreed with de Coubertin's ideas to such an extent that he resigned. The organization of the 1900 Games was haphazard by today's standards, and although some events, such as archery, drew widespread attention, many others were poorly attended. Historians' opinions still differ over which events should be considered "Olympic".

Consequently, the IOC supported the Greek idea by granting them a second series of quadrennial games in between the first series. All of the games would be International Olympic Games: the difference was that half of them would follow Coubertin's idea of "organisation internationale", while the other half would follow the Greeks' idea of a permanent home with the Committee of the Olympic Games, as it was then known, as experienced organisers. 

This was a departure from the ancient schedule, but it was expected that, if the ancient Greeks could keep a four-year schedule, the modern Olympic Movement could keep a two-year schedule. As 1902 was now too close to be logistically workable, and Greece was experiencing political and economic difficulties, the 2nd Olympic Games in Athens were scheduled for 1906, and the IOC as a whole gave Greece full support for the organisation.

The 1904 Summer Olympics in St. Louis, Missouri were overshadowed by the Louisiana Purchase Exposition, and their organization was even worse than that of Paris 1900, while travel difficulties meant that only 20% of the athletes were non-American; of these, half were Canadian.

It was clear the Olympic Movement was in a dire situation, and desperately needed to recapture the spirit of Athens 1896: it also needed to do so quickly, as to those who did not participate in St. Louis, Rome 1908 was a gap of eight years, by which time there would be little if any goodwill left for the Games. 

To make matters worse, Rome was also planning an Exhibition at the same time as the Games, which had been responsible for the failures of Paris and St. Louis.

To the IOC, the 1906 Athens Games being just around the corner would have been a lifeline: while De Coubertin still opposed the idea, and did not do anything more than his function required him to, the IOC as a whole gave the Greek organizing committee full support for the organisation.

Improvements 

The 1906 Games were quite successful: unlike the Games of 1900, 1904 or 1908, they were not stretched out over several months, and unlike 1900 and 1904, they were not overshadowed by an international exposition. Their crisp implementation was most likely instrumental in the continued existence of the Games.

Contemporary publications praised the Games:

These Games were the first to have:
 All athlete registration going through their NOCs.
 The Opening of the Games as a separate event: an event at which the athletes marched into the stadium in national teams, each following its national flag.
 An Olympic Village (at the Zappeion). 
 A formal Closing Ceremony.
 The raising of national flags for the medalists.

These, along with various other changes, are now accepted as tradition.

Games 

The Games were held from 22 April to 2 May 1906, in Athens, Greece. They took place in the Panathenaic Stadium, which had already hosted the 1896 Games and the earlier Zappas Olympics of 1870 and 1875. The games excluded several disciplines that had occurred during the past two games; it was unclear whether they ought to have been part of the Olympic Games. Added to the program were the javelin throw and the pentathlon.

Opening 
The games included a real opening ceremony, watched by a large crowd. The athletes, for the first time, entered the stadium as national teams, marching behind their flags. The official opening of the games was done by King George I.

Highlights 

 There were only two standing jump events in Athens, but Ray Ewry successfully defended his titles in both of them, bringing his total up to 8 gold medals. In 1908 he would successfully defend them one last time for a total of 10 Olympic titles, a feat unparalleled until 2008 when Michael Phelps pushed his Olympic gold medal total to 14.
 Paul Pilgrim won both the 400 and 800 metres, a feat that was first repeated during Montreal 1976 by Alberto Juantorena.
 Canadian Billy Sherring lived in Greece for two months, to adjust to the local conditions. His efforts paid off as he unexpectedly won the Marathon. Prince George accompanied him on the final lap.
 Finland made its Olympic debut, and immediately won a gold medal, as Verner Järvinen won the Discus (Greek style) event.
 Peter O'Connor of Ireland won gold in the hop, step and jump (triple jump) and silver in the long jump. In protest at being put on the British team, O'Connor scaled the flagpole and hoisted the Irish flag, while the pole was guarded by Irish and American athletes and supporters.
 Martin Sheridan of the Irish American Athletic Club, competing for the U.S. team, won gold in the 16-pound Shot put and the Freestyle Discus throw and silver in the Standing high jump, Standing long jump and Stone throw. He scored the greatest number of points of any athlete at the Games. For his accomplishments he was presented with a ceremonial javelin by King Georgios I. This javelin is still on display in a local pub near Sheridan's hometown in Bohola, County Mayo, Ireland.

Closing ceremony 
Six thousand schoolchildren took part in possibly the first ever Olympic closing ceremony.

Participating nations 
854 athletes, 848 men and 6 women, from 20 countries, competed at the 1906 Intercalated Games.

Medals awarded 
78 events in 14 disciplines, comprising 12 sports, were part of the 1906 Games.

Medal count
These medals were distributed but are no longer recognized by the International Olympic Committee.

Notes

The mixed team medal is for two Belgian and one Greek athletes in the Coxed Pairs 1 mile rowing event.
 In the football tournament, the silver medal for the team from Smyrna was won by footballers from various nationalities (English, French and Armenian), while the bronze medal for the team from Thessalonica was won by ethnic Greeks who competed for Greece, despite both cities being Ottoman possessions at the time.
Egypt was the only country that competed but did not win medals.

Decline of the Intercalated Games
The Greeks were, despite their best efforts, unable to keep the schedule for 1910. While there had been serious political tensions in the Balkans, the modern Greeks found out their ancient ancestors were right: a two-year interval was too short. There had been effectively a gap of six years before Athens 1906, due to the predominantly American nature of the 1904 St. Louis Games, but Athens 1910 would have left a gap of two years after the 1908 London Games, which would have made it virtually impossible to prepare.

With Athens 1910 being a failure, the faith in the Intercalated Games diminished: as a result, plans for Athens 1914 got even less support before the outbreak of World War I, meaning any further Intercalated Games had to wait until after the war, which ended in 1918. 

Since it had been twelve years since Athens 1906, and in any case, the next possible event would have been in 1922 - sixteen years after the first - the idea of Intercalated Games was given up entirely.

Downgrading
Since the 2nd International Olympic Games in Athens had become an exception, the personal views of various IOC chairmen caused the IOC to retroactively downgrade the 1906 Games, and their explanation for the Games became that they had been a 10th anniversary celebration. 

Also, more stress was placed on the continuing sequence of four-year Olympiads, and the Games of 1906 did not fit into this. Hence, the IOC currently does not recognize Athens 1906 as Olympic Games, and does not regard any events occurring there (such as the setting of new records or the winning of medals) as official.

Despite this, the success of Athens 1906, however, may have been what kept the Olympics alive after the failures of 1900 and 1904. As the next Games are always built on the successes of the last, the innovations of Athens were used again in London, and eventually became Olympic tradition. 

In fact, the influence of the First Intercalated Games pervades the Olympics, with the holding of the Games concentrated in a small time period in a small area.

See also 

 IOC country codes

Notes

References

Further reading
 The Olympic games at Athens, 1906 – James Edward Sullivan, 1906.

 
1906 in Greek sport
1906 in multi-sport events
April 1906 sports events
May 1906 sports events
Olympic Games in Greece
Sports competitions in Athens
1900s in Athens